The Church of St. Elizabeth, commonly known as Blue Church (Modrý kostolík, Kék templom), is a Hungarian-Secessionist (Jugendstil, Art Nouveau) Catholic church located in the eastern part of the Old Town in Bratislava, present-day Slovakia. It is consecrated to Elisabeth of Hungary, daughter of Andrew II, who grew up in the Pressburg Castle (Pozsonyi vár).
It is referred to as "The Little Blue Church" because of the colour of its façade, mosaics, majolicas and blue-glazed roof. It was initially part of the neighboring gymnázium (high school) and served as the school chapel.

Architecture
The one-nave church was built in 1908-1913, four years after the plans of Ödön Lechner to build a church in the Hungarian Art Nouveau style. The so-called Hungarian secessionist style forms dominate in the church. Lechner also drew plans of the neighbouring gymnázium (high school) and of the vicarage (also in the Hungarian Secessionist style).

The ground floor of the church is oval. In the foreground there is a 36.8 metre high cylindrical church tower. At first, a cupola was planned, but was never constructed; instead, a barrel vault was built, topped by a hip roof. The roof is covered with glazed bricks with decoration, for the purpose of parting.

The main and side entrances are enclosed with Romanesque double-pillars, which have an Oriental feeling. Pillars are also located near the windows.

The façade was at first painted with light pastel colours. Later the church got its characteristic blue colour. A line of blue tiles and wave-strip encircles the church.

Interior

The interior is richly decorated with altarpieces. On the altar there is an illustration of St Elizabeth, depicted giving alms to the poor.

A model of the church is in Mini-Europe in Brussels, representing Slovakia.

See also 
 St. Nicholas' Church, Bratislava
 Franciscan Church, Bratislava

References

Part of the information in this article is based on its German equivalent.

Roman Catholic churches in Bratislava
20th-century Roman Catholic church buildings in Slovakia
Art Nouveau architecture in Slovakia
Art Nouveau church buildings
1908 establishments in Austria-Hungary